Rich Keeble is a British actor and voiceover artist. He has appeared as a regular on two series of The Emily Atack Show and in television series such as Warren, Doctors, Porters, The Rebel and Birds of a Feather, as well as voice acting for video games including Strange Brigade, Total War: Warhammer and Ancestors Legacy.

Education
Keeble attended Tiffin School in Kingston upon Thames in the 1990s.

Career

Television, film and online 
Between 2010 and 2015, Keeble appeared as various characters in sketches for Lee Nelson's Well Good Show, Alan Carr's Summertime Specstacular, Alan Carr's New Year Specstacular, hidden camera show Fool Britannia (starring Dom Joly), and had small roles in sitcoms Birds of a Feather and The Delivery Man. In 2013, he appeared in a recurring ident on the BBC directed by Victoria Pile, playing the character of Gary whose living room is invaded by a panda played by Steve Marsh.

In 2015 he portrayed Dr. Williams in the drama thriller film Survivors.

Keeble co-writes and stars in the comedy web series Rich Keeble Vanity Project which won the "Best UK Series" award at UK Web Fest, and later won "Best British Web Series" at the 2017 Pilot Light TV Festival, and "Best Supporting Actor (comedy)" (for co-star Sam Legassick) at the Indie Series Awards. It was also nominated for "Best UK Series" and "Best Writing" in the web series competition of the 24th Raindance Film Festival.

In November 2016 he regularly appeared on the entertainment television series Animal Antics on Viasat Nature, directed by Nick Mavroidakis (Rude Tube). In March 2017 he appeared in Comedy Central's Bad Snappers and Channel 4's The Last Leg, appearing as a journalist in a sketch with Mr Blobby, and in another episode as an archaeologist discovering the remains of hosts Adam Hills, Josh Widdicombe and Alex Brooker. He appeared in an episode of The Rebel with Simon Callow in November 2017.

He provided the voice of the radio DJ on the Halloween special live episode of Inside No.9 broadcast on BBC Two on 28 October 2018. He was 'Richard the lawyer' in the 2018 Christmas special of Through the Keyhole, with Keith Lemon and Christopher Biggins.

In March 2019, he portrayed PC Mortimer in Series 2 of Porters (Dave). He also played three characters in the BBC1 sitcom Warren - Shop Assistant and two other voice roles (Radio Presenter and Taxi Operator). Keeble stars as William in the film Criminal Audition, which premiered at London FrightFest 2019. He has received a positive critical reception for his performance. In December 2019, he appeared as Mark Waddington in the BBC soap opera Doctors.

In 2022 he appeared as Toby in the fourth series of Ghosts.

Voice work 
He played the character Frank Fairburne in Strange Brigade, released 28 August 2018.

Stage 
In January 2011 he starred as British double agent Donald MacLean in A Morning with Guy Burgess at the Courtyard Theatre, London, written by John Morrison and based on the life of Guy Burgess. The play was featured on The Review Show on BBC Two. In 2014 he appeared in the comedy sketch show Kaile, Keeble & Kuntz with Luke Kaile at the Edinburgh Fringe.

Filmography

Film

Television

Video games

Discography 

 Rich Keeble & The More Accomplished Musicians (2017)
 In The Bath (2018)
 Lazy (2018)
 I Hope Every Special Day You Have Is Ruined in Some Way (2020)

References

External links 
Official Site

Agent's Website

Living people
English male film actors
English male stage actors
Year of birth missing (living people)